Primula bracteosa, the orange throated primrose, is a perennial species of primrose which is found on rocky crevices and of ravines at the altitudes of  in southern Xizhang, Bhutan, northeast India, Sikkim and Nepal.

History
The first specimen was collected in the 19th-century in Bhutan by William Cooper and William Griffith. The species was not studied back then, and was rediscovered again by Frank Ludlow and Sherriff in 1950s in Nepal.

Description
The species' margin is irregularly toothed and have rounded tip just like its winged stalk. Petals are broadly obovate and prominently toothed tips. They bloom from March to April.

References

bracteosa
Flora of Tibet
Flora of Nepal
Flora of East Himalaya
Flora of Assam (region)
Taxa named by William Grant Craib